The Styx River is a  river in the state of Alabama. It rises in Baldwin County near the town of Bay Minette in the southwestern part of the state and is a tributary to the Perdido River. It is named for the River Styx in Greek mythology. Where U.S. Highway 90 crosses the river by bridge, the attendant sign reads "Charon Retired".

References

External links
The Styx River at Trails.com

Rivers of Alabama
Rivers of Baldwin County, Alabama